A mask shop is a factory which manufactures photomasks for use in the semiconductor industry.  There are two distinct types found in the trade. Captive mask shops are in-house operations owned by the biggest semiconductor corporations, while merchant mask shops make masks for most of the industry.

Merchant mask shops will produce photomasks for a variety of integrated device manufacturers (IDMs), foundries or optical device companies in addition to providing excess cavity work and re-pellicle for captive mask shops.

The company structure is similar to that of any medium-sized manufacture and has the
following unique departments or mask makers:
Sales Customer / customer services
Front end data prep
Facilities maintenance - plant & environment
Engineering - equipment maintenance
Engineering - process, inspection & metrology
Quality assurance
Shipping & dispatching

Photomask market 
The worldwide photomask production market was $3.1 billion in 2013. Almost half of market attributed to captive mask shops (in-house mask shops of major chipmakers).

Infrastructure (technical and financial)
The costs of creating new mask shop for 180 nm processes were estimated in 2005 as $40 million, and for 130 nm - more than $100 million.  In 2013 cost of new 28 nm mask shop was estimated at $110 – 140 million.

Future
As technology shrinks, the cost to mask shops increase and the product turn around time grow longer as well. The trend in this new decade is for manufacturing to migrate eastwards to reduce cost and lead times. Once technology restrictions in the Wassenaar Arrangement are reduced, high end reticles and integrated circuits will be produced in mainland China
rather than Taiwan.

See also
 Computational lithography
 GDSII

References

Further reading

External links 
 Mask industry assessment: 2009 // Proc. SPIE 7488, Photomask Technology 2009, 748803 (September 29, 2009); doi:10.1117/12.832722
2013 mask industry survey // Proc. SPIE 8880, Photomask Technology 2013, 88800K (September 20, 2013); doi:10.1117/12.2033255
 SEMATECH’s Photomask Industry Survey Validates Top Industry Challenges and Identifies Long-Term Opportunities // ALBANY N.Y. (September 24, 2013)

Lithography (microfabrication)